New York's 60th State Senate district is one of 63 districts in the New York State Senate. It has been represented by Democrat Sean Ryan since 2021, succeeding Republican Chris Jacobs, who was elected to Congress.

Geography
District 60 is located entirely within Erie County in Western New York, including much of southern Buffalo and the surrounding suburbs of Brant, Evans, Grand Island, Hamburg, Orchard Park, and the city and town of Tonawanda.

The district overlaps with New York's 23rd and 26th congressional districts, and with the 140th, 141st, 142nd, 145th, 147th, and 149th districts of the New York State Assembly.

Recent election results

2020

2018

2016

2014

2012

Federal results in District 60

References

60